Invincible is a 2006 American sports drama film directed by Ericson Core. It is based on the nonfictional story of Vince Papale (Mark Wahlberg), who played for the Philadelphia Eagles from 1976 to 1978 with the help of his coach, Dick Vermeil (Greg Kinnear). The film was released in the United States on August 25, 2006.

Plot

In the 1970s, Philadelphia is in chaos as southern portions of the city protest the shutdown of several job sites while their NFL team, the Philadelphia Eagles, endures a string of losing seasons. In 1976, a 30 year old substitute teacher Vince Papale goes to a sandlot one night and joins his friends playing a pick-up football game against another group of young men. After the game ends, Papale goes home and finds his wife Sharon disgusted with his failure to provide proper support.

The next morning, Papale is unexpectedly laid off from his job at the school. That night, Papale goes to the bar where he works as a part-time bartender. The bar contains die-hard Eagles fans, who are watching a TV report on Eagles hiring a new head coach, Dick Vermeil, who will be staging open public tryouts for the Eagles; the bar regulars encourage Papale to attend the tryout. Returning home, Papale finds out that Sharon has left him, leaving him a note saying he will never be anything in the world. Distraught, Papale trashes the few remaining belongings that she left behind.

The next night at the bar, Papale meets a new co-bartender, Janet Cantrell, who is a Giants fan. Desperate for income in the aftermath of his wife's departure, Papale receives support from his friends and attends the tryout hosted at Veterans Stadium. Papale is competing against several hundred Philadelphia residents, but performs well during the workouts. After the tryouts, Dick Vermeil comes by as Papale is trying to start his car. Vermeil is impressed by Papale's performance and invites him to training camp to compete for a roster spot with the Eagles. Accepting, Papale receives a warm welcome at the bar, and has an interview with a newscaster.

The next day, Papale is jogging in the city and stops by his empty home; running into friends, he tells them about joining the Eagles. His father, meanwhile, offers to let Vince stay with him. The following day, he goes to his first training camp with the Eagles. As the days of training camp progress, Papale endures hard training and disrespect from other players. One night, Papale takes Janet out on a date. He is unsure if he can start a new relationship, since he needs to try his best to make the team. Janet claims that she did not know it was a date. She goes back to work and he leaves. As training camp ends, the final roster spot is down to Papale and a veteran. Against his assistants' advice, Vermeil hands the final spot to Papale.

As Papale's career with the Eagles begins, the team loses all six preseason games and their regular season opener against the Dallas Cowboys. Papale plays poorly against the Cowboys, and Vermeil faces pressure from the fans and media. After the team returns to Philadelphia, Papale goes to the sandlot where he played with his friends once before. He is invited to play, but he declines because of his upcoming Eagles game and watches for a few minutes. However, as a rainstorm begins, Papale joins his pals and plays against another sandlot team to help his friends. He ends the wet and dirty game by throwing a touchdown pass. When he runs into Janet later, they speak briefly before passionately embracing and tumbling into Papale's home.

During the home opener against the New York Giants, Janet's appearance in a Giants shirt angers the Eagles fans. In the locker room, Papale looks again at the note Sharon had left and tears it up. He opens the game by solo-tackling the kickoff returner inside the fifteen-yard line. After an up-and-down game, Papale gets downfield during an Eagles' fourth quarter punt to tackle the returner, forcing a fumble that he recovers and takes into the end zone for a touchdown, giving the Eagles their first win in Papale's career. Eagles fans go wild with joy. During the end credits, media highlights of Papale's career with the Eagles are shown. Papale plays for the team for three seasons and eventually marries Janet while Vermeil succeeds in turning the Eagles into a winning team, culminating in an appearance in Super Bowl XV.

Cast

Differences from the true story
In reality, Papale started playing football in the Delaware County Rough Touch League (PA) in the late 60's before his semi-professional and pro football experience. He then played with the semi-pro Aston Green Knights of the Seaboard Football League and two seasons with the Philadelphia Bell of the World Football League, one of the NFL's rival leagues on the level of the AFL and the USFL. Papale was a standout special teams star for the Bell, who played at Philadelphia's JFK Stadium.

Mark Wahlberg was shorter (5'8") than Vince Papale, who stood at 6'2" while playing for the Eagles. Mark Wahlberg was closer to Vince Papale's high-school height of 5'7".

Vince Papale's first wife did leave him, leaving a similar note. However, that happened in 1971, five years before the events of the movie.

The movie portrays Vince meeting Janet before the tryouts. In real life, Papale dated and married his second wife, Sandy during the movie's time frame. He was divorced and met Janet after his Eagles career as the couple married in 1993.

Papale did participate in an open tryout before earning his spot on the Bell roster, which the filmmakers used as a model for the tryout shown in the movie. For the Eagles, Papale actually participated in a private workout that was by invitation only.

The opening scene of the movie features the Eagles' 31−0 loss to the Cincinnati Bengals on December 7, 1975. One of the fans makes a comment that the Eagles lost to a team worse than they were. In 1975, the Bengals actually went 11–3 and were the wild card team in the AFC.

The game versus the New York Giants is depicted as being a close defensive struggle, with the Giants scoring first to take a 7–0 lead. The Eagles actually won easily, 20–7, with the Giants not scoring until late in the game. The fumble recovery depicted in the climactic scene did occur, but Papale's touchdown did not count, under NFL rules at the time, since the ball could not be advanced. It was still a key play in the victory for the Eagles. Papale never scored a regular-season touchdown in the NFL. His only offensive stat came in the 1977 season, where he had 1 catch for 15 yards. However, he scored his first NFL touchdown against the Patriots in a 1977 exhibition game. As with so many of his breaks, this was a big one—the game-winning score. Rookie Quarterback Mike Cordova threw from the Pats' 14, and Cornerback Raymond Clayborn deflected the ball slightly allowing Papale to make a diving catch in the end zone.

Filming

The preseason/tryout scenes were filmed at Franklin Field at the University of Pennsylvania, and the Central High School Lancers field during July and August 2005. (For 13 seasons, 1958–1970, Franklin Field was the home field of the Eagles.) The crew used their locker room and field. The Lancers, who had a preseason, used Fairmount Park in West Philadelphia during this time. The office scenes were filmed in Delaplaine McDaniel Middle School, during renovations to the school at 1801 Moore Street South Philadelphia. The carnival scenes were filmed at Our Lady of Mount Carmel School in South Philadelphia at 2329 South Third Street. Some of the street scenes were filmed on location in the city. The remainder of the film was filmed in a former aircraft carrier parts warehouse on Langley Avenue in the Philadelphia Naval Business Center. The crew shared this facility with the floats for the Philadelphia Thanksgiving Day Parade. The film opens with Jim Croce's "I Got a Name".

Box office
In opening weekend the movie made approximately $17,031,122 domestically. The movie generated an estimated $57,806,952 domestically.

Reception
The film received generally positive reviews from critics. It is certified "fresh" with a 72% approval rating on Rotten Tomatoes and has an average rating of 6.46/10, based on 135 reviews. The website's critical consensus reads, "As simple and authentic as the gritty South Philly environs in which it's set in, Invincible sends a uplifting and heartfelt message packed with an athletic enthusiasm that shouldn't be missed". On Metacritic, the film reached a score of 63 based on 28 critics, indicating "generally favorable reviews". Common Sense Media gave the film 4 out of 5 stars. Audiences polled by CinemaScore gave the film an average grade of "A-" on an A+ to F scale.

In popular culture
The film also inspired the show It’s Always Sunny in Philadelphia in its third season in an episode called “The Gang Gets Invincible” in which Dennis, Mac and Dee try out for the Philadelphia Eagles due to the movie Invincible; they also repeatedly refer to it as "that New Kids on the Block movie", seemingly confusing lead Mark Wahlberg, and specifically his lead role with Marky Mark and the Funky Bunch, with his brother Donnie Wahlberg.

Home media
The film released on DVD and Blu-ray on December 19, 2006. It re-released on a two-disc Blu-ray set on March 29, 2011.

See also

The Garbage Picking Field Goal Kicking Philadelphia Phenomenon

References

External links
 
 
 
 
 Invincible at the Sports Movie Database

2006 films
2000s sports drama films
American football films
2006 directorial debut films
Films set in Philadelphia
Films shot in Philadelphia
Films set in the 1970s
Films set in 1976
Philadelphia Eagles
Sports films based on actual events
Walt Disney Pictures films
Films scored by Mark Isham
Biographical films about sportspeople
Biographical films about educators
Cultural depictions of players of American football
Films directed by Ericson Core
2006 drama films
2000s English-language films
2000s American films